Doulouchu ( < Eastern Han Chinese: *to-lo-ḍiɑ) was a Xiongnu prince of unknown relationship to the Southern Xiongnu dynastic line who was proclaimed chanyu by the Han dynasty in 143 AD. Toulouchu resided in the Southern Xiongnu capital of Meiji in Xihe Commandery. It is doubtful whether he wielded any real power over his nominal subjects. He died four years later in 147 AD and was succeeded by Jucheer.

Footnotes

References

Bichurin N.Ya., "Collection of information on peoples in Central Asia in ancient times", vol. 1, Sankt Petersburg, 1851, reprint Moscow-Leningrad, 1950

Taskin B.S., "Materials on Sünnu history", Science, Moscow, 1968, p. 31 (In Russian)

Chanyus